The Baojun RC-6 is a crossover produced by SAIC-GM-Wuling through the Baojun brand.

Overview 

The RC-6 is a part of the "New Baojun" sub-category together with the RS-5 and RM-5. It made its debut at the 2019 Chengdu Motor Show.

The RC-6 come with driver assistance system developed by Bosch. To reduce driving fatigue including scenarios that involve heavy traffic, the Bosch Level-2 ADAS system covers 16 daily driving scenarios. Safety features of the RC-6 include Traffic Jam Assist, lane keeping assist, lane departure warning, intelligent cruise assist, Blind-Spot Collision-Avoidance Assist, traffic signal Warning and traffic speed assist. The advanced adaptive cruise control system on the RC-6 can be activated at a speed below . The combination of a 77-GHz long-range millimeter-wave radar and a multifunction high-definition camera is capable of identification of people, cars and roads. The LED headlights on the RC-6 is equipped with IHMA intelligent high and low beam switching for safety of other road users.

Powertrain 
The engine is paired with a choice of a six-speed manual transmission or a virtual eight-speed continuously variable transmission (CVT).

References 

RC-6
Cars introduced in 2019
2020s cars
Mid-size sport utility vehicles
Crossover sport utility vehicles
Hatchbacks
Front-wheel-drive vehicles
Vehicles with CVT transmission
Cars of China